Sondre Sørløkk (born 8 May 1997) is a Norwegian footballer who plays as a midfielder for Ull/Kisa.

Career
Sørløkk started his career at Meldal as a junior, he then moved to Orkla in 2014. Sørløkk signed with Ranheim in 2016.

Sørløkk made his debut for Ranheim in Eliteserien in a 4–1 win against Stabæk.

Career statistics

References

1997 births
Living people
People from Meldal
Norwegian footballers
Association football midfielders
Ranheim Fotball players
IL Stjørdals-Blink players
Ullensaker/Kisa IL players
Norwegian Third Division players
Norwegian Second Division players
Norwegian First Division players
Eliteserien players
Sportspeople from Trøndelag